Asymphorodes admirandus is a moth of the family Agonoxenidae. It was described by Edward Meyrick in 1934. It is found in French Polynesia.

References

Agonoxeninae
Moths described in 1934
Moths of Oceania
Endemic fauna of French Polynesia